Achilleas Kaimakli FC was a Cypriot football club based in Kaimakli, Nicosia. Founded in 1957, it played in the second, third and fourth divisions. The team dissolved after 1988. The team was part of the sports club Achilleas Kaimakli.

References

Defunct football clubs in Cyprus
Association football clubs established in 1943
1943 establishments in Cyprus